William Ellerington (30 June 1923 – 4 April 2015) was an English  footballer who was capped twice for the full England national team and once for England B, and spent his entire professional club career at Southampton F.C.

Born in Southampton, Ellerington signed as a professional with his home-town club in September 1945 and made his debut in an FA Cup game at Newport County on 10 January 1946. After retiring in 1956, he became a scout and is credited with spotting the young Mick Channon.

His father, also called Bill, was a half back with Middlesbrough and Nelson in the 1920s.

References

External links
 
 

1923 births
2015 deaths
Footballers from Southampton
English footballers
England international footballers
England B international footballers
Association football defenders
Southampton F.C. players
English Football League players
English Football League representative players